Dysart is a city in Tama County, Iowa, United States. The population was 1,281 at the 2020 census. The Mayor of Dysart is currently  Tim Glenn.

History
Dysart got its start in the year 1872, following construction of the Burlington, Cedar Rapids and Northern Railway through the territory. Dysart was platted in 1872. The town takes its name from Joseph Dysart, a farmer and founder of the town.

Geography
Dysart is located at  (42.168831, -92.308165).

Demographics

2010 census
As of the census of 2010, there were 1,379 people, 544 households, and 380 families living in the city. The racial makeup of the city was 97.6% White, 0.5% African American, 0.1% Native American, 0.2% Asian, 0.4% from other races, and 1.2% from two or more races. Hispanic or Latino of any race were 1.5% of the population.

There were 544 households, of which 31.8% had children under the age of 18 living with them, 58.3% were married couples living together, 9.9% had a female householder with no husband present, 1.7% had a male householder with no wife present, and 30.1% were non-families. 24.8% of all households were made up of individuals, and 13.3% had someone living alone who was 65 years of age or older. The average household size was 2.47 and the average family size was 2.96.

The median age in the city was 42 years. 26% of residents were under the age of 18; 5.8% were between the ages of 18 and 24; 21.7% were from 25 to 44; 25.2% were from 45 to 64; and 21.4% were 65 years of age or older. The gender makeup of the city was 48.3% male and 51.7% female.

2000 census
As of the census of 2000, there were 1,303 people, 529 households, and 358 families living in the city. The racial makeup of the city was 98.47% White, 0.31% African American, 0.31% Native American, 0.23% Asian, 0.23% Pacific Islander, 0.08% from other races, and 0.38% from two or more races. Hispanic or Latino of any race were 0.54% of the population.

There were 529 households, out of which 31.4% had children under the age of 18 living with them, 59.2% were married couples living together, 5.5% had a female householder with no husband present, and 32.3% were non-families. 29.9% of all households were made up of individuals, and 17.6% had someone living alone who was 65 years of age or older. The average household size was 2.37 and the average family size was 2.95.

25.5% were under the age of 18, 5.7% from 18 to 24, 23.8% from 25 to 44, 20.9% from 45 to 64, and 24.2% were 65 years of age or older. The median age was 42 years. For every 100 females, there were 92.2 males. For every 100 females age 18 and over, there were 85.0 males.

The median income for a household in the city was $40,857, and the median income for a family was $45,774. Males had a median income of $34,063 versus $22,368 for females. The per capita income for the city was $20,203. About 4.4% of families and 6.8% of the population were below the poverty line, including 10.2% of those under age 18 and 3.7% of those age 65 or over.

Education
Union Community School District serves the municipality. The district was established on July 1, 1993 by the merger of the Dysart-Geneseo Community School District and La Porte City Community School District; the former was established on July 1, 1966 by the merger of the Dysart and Geneseo school districts.

Dysart has one kindergarten through fifth grade elementary: Dysart-Geneseo Elementary School.  Dysart-Geneseo's high school consolidated with La Porte City's in 1989. UCS has learning centers located in Dysart and La Porte City, Iowa. The district office as well as Union High School and one elementary school are located in La Porte City and the middle, Union Middle School, and another elementary school are located in Dysart.

Dysart Reporter

The Dysart Reporter is the weekly newspaper of Dysart, Iowa. It is published on Fridays and has a circulation of roughly 900. The newspaper has been the definitive source of Dysart area news for 134 years and counting. The paper primarily serves the community of Dysart, but also provides news and sports coverage of neighboring communities in Tama and Benton counties. The small towns of La Porte City and Clutier are included in this coverage area, along with the combined school district of Union.

Notes

References

External links
 Dysart, Iowa

Cities in Iowa
Cities in Tama County, Iowa